New Adventures is a British dance-theatre company. Founded by choreographer Matthew Bourne in 2001, the company developed from an earlier company Adventures in Motion Pictures, now dissolved.

History 
Adventures in Motion Pictures (AMP) was established in 1987 by a group of students from London's Laban Centre, including Matthew Bourne, Catherine White (now Malone), Emma Gladstone, Susan Lewis, Carrollynne Antoun, David Massingham and Keith Brazil. AMP's productions like Spitfire (1988), parodied the manners of romantic ballet dancers.

By 1991, the original members of the company were working outside of AMP, and Bourne held auditions for new dancers, forming a company with six core dancers, including Scott Ambler (later founder artistic associate), Etta Murfitt (now associate artistic director), Ben Wright, Ally Fitzpatrick and Jamie Watton. Their first piece together was Town & Country (1991). Subsequent AMP productions included Nutcracker! (1992), Highland Fling (1994), Swan Lake (1995), Cinderella (1997) and The Car Man (2000). 

In 2000, Bourne formed New Adventures with producer Robert Noble, who became co-director of the company. New Adventures Limited was incorporated in January 2001. New Adventures Charity (incorporated in 2008) is a registered charity (charity number: 1125342) that works "To advance the education of young people, dance practitioners and the general public particularly but not exclusively through the provision of workshops and classes with specific but not exclusive reference to the dance choreography of Matthew Bourne".

New Adventures has been a National Portfolio Organisation receiving funding from Arts Council England since 2015.

Awards

Laurence Olivier Awards 
AMP or New Adventures have received 12 Laurence Olivier Awards nominations, winning six.

Other awards

References

Dance companies in the United Kingdom